The 21st Assault Serbian Division was a Yugoslav Partisan division formed on Radan mountain on 20 May 1944. It was formed as 1st Serbia Division, but it was renamed on 14 June 1944. Upon formation it had around 1,000 soldiers in three brigades, those being: the 4th, 5th and 6th Serbia Divisions. Commander of the division was Miloje Milojević. The division mostly fought against Chetniks and Germans in occupied Serbia.

References 

Divisions of the Yugoslav Partisans
Military units and formations established in 1944